Long Điền Tây is a rural commune of Đông Hải District, Bạc Liêu Province in the Mekong Delta region of Vietnam.

References

Populated places in Bạc Liêu province
Communes of Bạc Liêu province